François Chollet is a French software engineer and artificial intelligence researcher currently working at Google. Chollet is the creator of the Keras deep-learning library, released in 2015, and a main contributor to the TensorFlow machine learning framework. His research focuses on computer vision, the application of machine learning to formal reasoning, abstraction, and how to achieve greater generality in artificial intelligence.

Chollet graduated with a Master of Engineering from the ENSTA Paris school in 2012 and started working at Google in 2015. His papers have been published at major conferences in the field, including the Conference on Computer Vision and Pattern Recognition (CVPR), the Conference on Neural Information Processing Systems (NeurIPS), the International Conference on Learning Representations (ICLR). He is the author of Xception: Deep Learning with Depthwise Separable Convolutions, which is among the top ten most cited papers in CVPR proceedings.

Chollet is the author of Deep Learning with Python, the co-author with Joseph J. Allaire of Deep Learning With R, and the creator of the Abstraction and Reasoning Corpus (ARC) Challenge.

On December 1, 2021, Chollet won the Global Swiss AI Award for breakthroughs in AI.

Bibliography

References 

French computer scientists
Artificial intelligence researchers
Google employees
Living people
Machine learning researchers
Year of birth missing (living people)